, provisional designation , is an Apollo class potentially hazardous asteroid discovered on October 17, 2011, by the Catalina Sky Survey project. It was rated at Torino Scale 1 on October 27, 2011, with an observation arc of 9.6 days.

Description 

 briefly had about a 1 in a million chance of impacting in 2029. Its cumulative impact probability dropped to 1 in 71 million by 2 November 2011 when the observation arc reached 15 days. It was removed from the Sentry Risk Table on 4 November 2011 when all impact scenarios for the next 100 years or more were ruled out. During 2029, the closest approach to Earth is 1.6 AU. Palomar Observatory precovery images from 1989 and 1990 have extended the observation arc to 22 years.

With an absolute magnitude of 15.8, it is one of the brightest and therefore largest potentially hazardous asteroids (PHA) detected since .

References

External links 
 
 
 

415029
415029
415029
415029
20111017